Francesco Di Nunzio (born 8 November 1985) is an Italian professional footballer who plays for  club Turris, as a central defender.

Club career
After appearing for Lega Pro sides, Di Nunzio joined Serie B club S.S. Juve Stabia on 14 July 2013. He appeared in more than 100 matches for his previous club, Sorrento Calcio.

On 31 August Di Nunzio made his division debut, starting in a 1–2 home loss against Spezia Calcio.

On 5 September 2018, he joined a Serie D club Turris.

References

External links

1985 births
Living people
Footballers from Rome
Italian footballers
Association football defenders
A.S.D. Sorrento players
S.S. Juve Stabia players
Serie B players
Serie C players